Sanitiar Burhanuddin (17 July 1954) is the present Attorney General of Indonesia, serving since October 2019 in the cabinet of President Joko Widodo. He was previously deputy attorney general for civil and state administrative cases. 

Upon his appointment, he denied having links to any political parties, despite his older brother, Tubagus Hasanuddin, being an executive of the ruling Indonesian Democratic Party of Struggle (PDI-P) and a former military secretary to former president and incumbent PDI-P leader Megawati Sukarnoputri.

In response to calls for the government to settle unresolved cases of human rights abuses, including the Semanggi shootings, Burhanuddin in January 2020 said the National Commission on Human Rights had not submitted complete evidence to the Attorney General's Office. He also said the incidents could not be classified as gross violations of human rights. Amnesty International Indonesia’s Executive Director Usman Hamid said Burhanuddin's "claims that these shootings did not violate human rights are simply not credible."

Background
Burhanuddin's given name Sanitiar is commonly abbreviated to ST. He said this came about when he completed elementary school; his teacher wrote his name on his graduation certificate as ST Burhanuddin and the truncated name stuck.

He began his career at Jambi High Prosecutor's Office in 1989. He graduated from Diponegoro University's Faculty of Law and later served at District Attorney Offices in a number of regions, from Bangko in Jambi province to Cilacap in Central Java.

In 2007, Burhanuddin served as the Attorney General's Execution and Examination Director. He was head of the Provincial Prosecutor's Office of North Maluku from 2008 to 2009.

While serving as head of South Sulawesi Provincial Prosecutor's Office and West Sulawesi Provincial Prosecutor's Office in 2010, Burhanuddin reportedly focused on handling corruption cases. In November 2010, he likened corruption to farting, saying there is a smell but no form. Therefore, his task was to prove the form. 

Burhanuddin once had to deal with a corruption case involving the former regent of Gowa, Ichsan Yasin Limpo. Ichsan was the younger brother of Syahrul Yasin Limpo, a former governor of South Sulawesi, who is minister of agriculture for the 2019-2024 period.

Burhanduddin was Deputy Attorney General for Civil and State Administration from 2011 until retiring in 2014.

In 2015, he became President Commissioner of PT Hutama Karya, the holding company of state-owned enterprises in the infrastructure sector, overseeing Jasa Marga, Waskita Karya, Adhi Karya and Yodya Karya. He resigned from the position in October 2019 after being appointed attorney general.

References

1954 births
Attorneys General of Indonesia
Diponegoro University alumni
Living people
People from Cirebon